Mouza Adlana is a town of Bhawana City a tehsil of Chiniot District of Punjab province of Pakistan. Mouza Adlana is situated at about 29 km away from Chiniot city and about 16 km from tehsil Bhowana. 

The main tribe in the village is the Jappa tribe; other supporting castes include Kumar, Nai, Tarkhan, Muslim Shaikh, Lohar, Machi and Miraci.

Most people are farmers and the land is very fertile.

References

{www.google.ca/maps/place/Adlana,+Jhang,+Punjab,+Pakistan/@31.5825707,72.7762807,14z/data=!4m2!3m1!1s0x3922344a77e1b4bb:0x4977bb0667b5f29c}

Chiniot District
Populated places in Chiniot District